Gunther (c. 955–1045) was a German (Bavarian) Catholic hermit and diplomat, who had quite important role in early history of Hungary and especially Bohemia, thanks to his good personal relationships to the rulers of those countries. In Czech, German and Hungarian settings is venerated as a saint although he never had been officially canonized.

Life
Gunther was born in around 955 to a noble family, related to the imperial Ottonian dynasty as well as with the Hungarian Arpads. He was a Duke of Thuringia, and is numbered among the ancestors of the princely house of Schwarzburg. He spent the early part of his life at court in the midst of worldly pleasures and ambitious intrigues.

He was converted in 1005 at the age of fifty by Gotthard of Hildesheim, Abbot of Hersfeld, later Bishop of Hildesheim, and resolved to embrace the monastic life in order to do penance for his past faults. With the consent of his heirs, he bequeathed all his goods to the Abbey of Hersfeld, reserving the right to richly endow and maintain the monastery of Göllingen, the ownership of which he persisted in retaining despite all the efforts of Gotthard to prevent him. In 1006, the novice made a pilgrimage to Rome, and in the following year made his vows as lay brother in the monastery of Niederaltaich before the holy Abbot Gotthard. Gunther helped to bring civilization to the region by clearing the forests and planting fields.

Soon afterwards, Gunther urgently entreated to be allowed to govern his monastery of Göllingen, and Gotthard's remonstrances could not turn him aside from his purpose. Shortly after his elevation to the abbacy, the former lay brother fell ill, and as he could not agree with his monks, the affairs of the monastery were soon in a perilous condition. By his charitable counsels mingled with severe reprimands, Gotthard succeeded in dispelling the ambitious views of Gunther, who returned once more to his humble condition at Niederaltaich, and led an edifying life.

In 1008, he withdrew to a wild, steep place near Lalling in the Bavarian Forest, to live there as a hermit. In 1011, he penetrated farther north in the forest with several companions and settled at Rinchnach, where he built cells and a church of St. John Baptist. Here he lived for thirty-four years a life of the greatest poverty and mortification. The very water was measured out to the brothers, guests alone being free to use at as they would.

It is said that Gunther received the gift of infused knowledge and became a powerful preacher though deficient in ordinary ecclesiastical learning: he could probably neither read nor write. Wolfher, his biographer, relates that he knew him intimately, and often heard his admirable sermons on his patron, St John the Baptist—sermons which drew tears from all who heard them.

Gunther paid many visits to his relative, Hungarian king, obtained from him large sums for the poor, and urged him to build a number of churches and monasteries. Mabillon has reproduced the deed of donation made by King Stephen on 6 June 1009. In 1029 Conrad II richly endowed the monastery of Rinchnach, and in 1040 Emperor Henry III affiliated it with Niederaltaich Abbey.

In his old age, Gunther was highly respected by the rulers of Roman Empire (Germany), Bohemia, Hungary and Poland. This allowed him to successfully negotiate between the Bohemian and German factions in the conflict
Duke Bretislaus I of Bohemia and the German king Henry III in 1040. Gunther was likely present at the German defeat in the Battle at Brůdek on 22/23 August 1040, and he was the leader of the delegation negotiating with Bretislaus at Chlumec in the aftermath of the battle.

Gunther died at about the age of ninety in the hermitage on Březník mountain (in today's Prášily municipality, near Hartmanice, southwestern Bohemia) on 9 October 1045, in the arms of Duke Bretislaus and of Šebíř, Bishop of Prague. He was buried in Břevnov Monastery but his remains were destroyed by the Hussites in 1420.

Legacy

St. Gunther's Way is a walking holiday route that runs from Niederalteich Abbey on the Danube via Rinchnach and the Guntherstein into Bohemia. Departing from the Niederalteich Monastery on the Danube, the path goes deep into the Bavarian Forest and across the Czech border to hamlet Dobrá Voda (now part of town Hartmanice).

In that hamlet stands the only church in the world dedicated to this person, the Church of Saint Gunther, built in the years of 1706–34 and carefully renovated to 1995, on the occasion of 950 years since the saint's death. During the reconstruction, interior of the church was newly created by Czech artist Vladimíra Tesařová in a unique way: altar, sacrificial table, lectern, crèche, Stations of the Cross and the statue of Gunther himself are all cast from glass.

Also in Hungary can be found a reminder of Gunther: one of the two main churches in the town Mór, the Church of Holy Trinity, has a Baroque Gunther's statue (from 1744) in a niche on the right side of its portal facade.

References

950s births
1045 deaths
German Christian monks
11th-century Christian mystics
Roman Catholic mystics
Czech Roman Catholic saints
Hungarian Roman Catholic saints
Hermits